Islamic Association of Palestine (IAP, also known as Islamic Association for Palestine) was an organization accused of raising money in the United States for Hamas established in 1981 and defunct since 2004. It described itself as "a not-for-profit, public-awareness, educational, political, social, and civic, national grassroots organization dedicated to advancing a just, comprehensive, and eternal solution to the cause of Palestine and suffrages of the Palestinians." For a time it also used the name American Muslim Society (AMS) and operated as the American Middle Eastern League for Palestine (AMEL).

The Islamic Association of Palestine had strong ties to the Holy Land Foundation for Relief and Development and to several organizations established in the U.S. to serve as fronts for the U.S.-terrorist designated Hamas.
Founders included Mousa Mohammed Abu Marzook, funder and 1989 member of IAP Board of Directors.

Establishment and goals
As terror finance expert Matthew Levitt reported, Hamas invested considerable resources to give "the Palestinian cause an Islamic flavor." U.S. authorities believed that the Islamic Association of Palestine was established towards that goal, as well as to raise funds for Hamas.

The Islamic Association of Palestine was intimately tied to Hamas, and especially to its senior leadership. Levitt observed that the organization "was originally formed in 1981 by Dr. Aly Mishal at the personal direction of Khaled Mishal (who was then a senior Muslim Brotherhood activist and would later become secretary general of Hamas." When the Muslim Brotherhood leader in Gaza formally established Hamas in 1987, "the IAP became the group's mouthpiece in North America."

Affiliation with Hamas and the Muslim Brotherhood
In a May 1991 memorandum written by alleged Muslim Brotherhood member Mohamed Akram Adlouni, and titled "An Explanatory memorandum on the General Strategic Goal for the Group in North America," Adlouni argued that IAP and numerous other organizations should unite around the goal of turning America into a Muslim country and promoting the Western civilization, writing, "Imagine if they all march according to one plan!!!". According to The Bridge Initiative at Georgetown University, Adlouni's "language is wishful, and does not reflect the Muslim Brotherhood's agenda as outlined in documents obtained by the FBI."

The other organizations named in the memorandum included:
 Association of Muslim Scientists and Engineers (AMSE)
 Islamic Society of North America (ISNA)
 Muslim Students Association (MSA)
 Muslim Communities Association (MCA)
 Association of Muslim Social Scientists (AMSS)
 Islamic Medical Association (IMA)
 Islamic Teaching Center (ITC)
 North American Islamic Trust (NAIT)
 Foundation for International Development (FID)
 Islamic Housing Cooperative (IHC)
 Islamic Centers Division (ICD)
 American Trust Publications (ATP)
 Audio-Visual Center (AVC)
 Islamic Book Service (IBS)
 Muslim Businessmen Association (MBA)
 Muslim Youth of North America (MYNA)
 ISNA Fiqh Committee (IFC, now known as Fiqh Council of North America)
 ISNA Political Awareness Committee (IPAC)
 Islamic Education Department (IED)
 Muslim Arab Youth Asociaation (MAYA)
 Malaysian Islamic Study Group (MISG)
 Islamic Association of Palestine (IAP)
 United Association for Studies and Research (UASR)
 Occupied Land Fund, later known as Holy Land Foundation for Relief and Development)
 Mercy International Association (MIA)
 Islamic Circle of North America (ICNA)
 Baitul Mal Inc. (BMI)
 International Institute for Islamic Thought (IIIT)
 Islamic Information Center (IIC)

Several among IAP officers and founding members were Hamas senior leaders who participated to the 1993 Philadelphia meeting attended by Hamas officers. Some former Islamic Association of Palestine staffers and members were founding members of the Council on American-Islamic Relations (CAIR). This is the case of Nihad Awad, CAIR's executive director who was affiliated to the Islamic Association of Palestine, and who was also a "self-identified supporter of the Hamas movement." In a March 1994 speech at Barry University, future CAIR Executive Director Awad said in response to an audience question about the various humanitarian efforts in the Palestinian Occupied Territories, "I am in support of the Hamas movement more than the PLO... there are some [Hamas] radicals, we are not interested in those people." The statement was made before Hamas carried out its first suicide bombing and was designated a terrorist organization by the United States government.

IAP founders included Mousa Mohammed Abu Marzook, funder and 1989 member of IAP Board of Directors. Abu Marzook served as the chairman of the advisory committee and allegedly donated startup funds to IAP, while providing seed money to the Holy Land Foundation "and operational funds for Mohammed Salah [a self-confessed Hamas member and military commander based in Chicago] to deliver to Hamas operatives in the West Bank."  Allegedly, seven checks, for a total amount of $125,000, were deposited into IAP bank account between 1990 and 1991.

Since the establishment of Hamas, IAP served as Hamas's public voice in the United States. The Islamic Association of Palestine published a magazine, Tareeq Filistine (Road to Palestine), Ila Filastin (To Palestine) and the newspapers Al-Zaytuna (The Olive) and Muslim World Monitor. In general, most of its publications consisted of flyers and communiqués encouraging jihad and endorsing Hamas's mission. Oliver Revell, former chief of the FBI's counter-terrorism department, called IAP "a front organization for Hamas that engages in propaganda for Islamic militants."

Matthew Levitt reported that IAP published the Hamas charter and distributed Hamas publication in the U.S. Filisteen al-Muslima, "which pays glowing tributes to Hamas suicide bombers, justifies their attacks, and suggests they be models for future suicide bombers."

IAP also held conventions and workshop to rally support for Hamas. Allegedly, the organization often declared its support for Hamas' role in the Palestinian Intifada against Israel. In his 2006 book titled "Hamas: Politics, Charity, and Terrorism in the Service of Jihad" Matthew Levitt extensively referenced a December 1989 communiqué published by IAP that serves as a clear example of IAP's efforts to endorse Hamas' mission. The 1989 communiqué reads: "the only way to liberate Palestine, all of Palestine, is the path of Jihad," and "Hamas is the conscience of the Palestinian Mujahid people."

Hamas's fundraiser
IAP publicly called for donations to be directed to the Holy Land Foundation and assisted the foundation in its efforts to fundraise on behalf of Hamas. For instance, the December 1989 communiqué quoted in Matthew Levitt's book invited readers to "perform jihad for the sake of God with your money and donate as much as you can to support the Intifada in Palestine," and directs the funds to the Holy Land Foundation. Generally, solicitations for the Holy Land Foundation were included in almost all of IAP publications.

Furthermore, Levitt recorded that the Islamic Association of Palestine "negotiated fundraising contracts by which the HLFRD [Holy Land Foundation for Relief and Development] paid the IAP $40,000 for the IAP fundraising services."

IAP fundraising efforts on behalf of Hamas were confirmed by Hamas officers. In February 1996 a Hamas activist affiliated with IAP told an FBI source that IAP devolved $3 million per year to the Palestinian cause, funds that were sent to the Holy Land Foundation in Palestine and ultimately received by Hamas.

Legal issues
In December 2004, a federal judge in Chicago ruled that the IAP (along with the Holy Land Foundation) was liable for a $156 million lawsuit for aiding and abetting the terror group Hamas in the death of 17-year-old David Boim, an American citizen. In December 2007 the United States Court of Appeals for the Seventh Circuit overturned the judge's ruling, holding that plaintiffs failed to prove that financial contributions to Hamas played a direct role in Boim's slaying. In 2008, the Seventh Circuit reheard the case en banc, and ruled in favor of the Boims.

Former Islamic Association of Palestine staffers and members were founding members of the Council on American-Islamic Relations (CAIR).

References

External links
iap.org was the IAP domain name until after February 2005.
Site Institute See also Site institute

Religious charities based in the United States
Islamic organizations based in the United States
Islamic political organizations
Islamic terrorism in the United States
Covert organizations